Harold Walker may refer to:

Harold Walker, Baron Walker of Doncaster (1927–2003), British Labour politician and life peer
Harold Walker (British Army officer) (1862–1934), English general who led ANZAC forces in the First World War
Harold Walker (Royal Navy officer) (1891–1975), Royal Navy admiral
Harold Berners Walker (born 1932), former British Ambassador to Iraq, Bahrain and the UAE, son of Admiral Harold Walker
Harold Walker (cricketer) (1918–2000), English cricketer
Harold Walker (footballer) (1895–1935), Australian footballer

See also
Hal Walker (1896–1972), American film director
Harry Walker (disambiguation)